Subaşı is a village in the Sincik District, Adıyaman Province, Turkey. The village is populated by Kurds of the Reşwan tribe and had a population of 107 in 2021.

References

Villages in Sincik District
Kurdish settlements in Adıyaman Province